"Ain't That Lovin' You, Baby" is an upbeat blues song, written and recorded by Jimmy Reed.  The single reached number eight in the US Billboard R&B chart in late March 1956.  Backing Reed (guitar, harmonica, and vocal) are Eddie Taylor (guitar), Vernel Fournier (drums), and an unknown guitarist.

"Ain't That Lovin' You Baby" has been recorded by a variety of artists, including the Newbeats on the debut album Bread & Butter, Link Wray, Dale Hawkins, Ronnie Hawkins, the Everly Brothers on Gone, Gone, Gone, Etta James on Etta James Rocks the House,  Eric Clapton on Blues,  Steve Miller on Living in the 20th Century, and the Youngbloods on their debut album, The Youngbloods.

References

1953 songs
1956 singles
Songs written by Jimmy Reed
Jimmy Reed songs
The Newbeats songs
The Everly Brothers songs
The Youngbloods songs
Vee-Jay Records singles
Blues songs